This is a list of episodes from the eighth season of Hawaii Five-O.

Broadcast history
The season originally aired Fridays at 9:00-10:00 pm (EST) from September 12 to November 28, 1975 and Thursdays at 9:00-10:00 pm (EST) from December 4, 1975 to March 4, 1976.

DVD release
The season was released on DVD by Paramount Home Video.

Episodes

References

08
1975 American television seasons
1976 American television seasons